The GY postcode area, also known as Guernsey postcode area, its post town, is a group of 10 consecutive postal districts covering Guernsey, Alderney, Sark, Herm and the two inhabited lesser islets in that region of the Channel Islands. It was established in 1993 as an extension of the United Kingdom postcode system.

Coverage
The approximate coverage of the postal districts. The post town is GUERNSEY for all postcode districts

Previously, both Alderney and Sark were covered by the GY9 district. In March 2009, Royal Mail had "agreed in principle" for the creation of the GY10 district which would cover all addresses on the island of Alderney, leaving just those of smaller Sark in GY9. This was intended to reduce the amount of mail being sent to the wrong island. The States of Alderney opposed doing it that way round, and instead Sark changed from sector GY9 0 to GY10 1 on 5 January 2011.

See also
Postcode Address File
Guernsey Post
List of postcode areas in the United Kingdom
Jersey postcode area

References

External links
Royal Mail's Postcode Address File
A quick introduction to Royal Mail's Postcode Address File (PAF)

Postcode Area GY
Postcode areas covering the Crown Dependencies